Štěpán Kolář (born 19 June 1979) is Czech football goalkeeping coach a former goalkeeper, who last played for Viktoria Žižkov. He made his Gambrinus liga début on 30 May 2009 for Viktoria Žižkov against Plzeň. He is currently employed at Slavia Prague in the Czech First League.

References

External links
 Guardian Football

1979 births
Living people
Czech footballers
Association football goalkeepers
Czech First League players
1. FK Příbram players
Bohemians 1905 players
FK Viktoria Žižkov players
SK Slavia Prague non-playing staff
Association football goalkeeping coaches